Phacelia cicutaria, with the common names caterpillar phacelia or caterpillar scorpionweed, is an annual species of Phacelia.

It is native to California, southern Nevada, and Baja California. It grows mainly in chaparral habitats, frequently in burnt areas or on rocky slopes.

Description
Phacelia cicutaria is an upright annual shrub growing up to 0.6 m (2') high. Its foliage is deeply lobed, 2–15 cm (1-6") long, with spiked segments.

The flower buds are held in tight, hairy coils which uncoil as the flowers open one by one. The flowering stems' resemblance of caterpillars lends this plant its common name. Flowers appear between March and May and are dirty-white to pale lavender in color.

Cultivation
Phacelia cicutaria is cultivated as an ornamental plant, in native plant and wildlife gardens, and for natural landscaping designs and habitat restoration projects. Its drought tolerance makes it well suited for water conserving gardens.

It can be propagated by seed, germination of which may be stimulated with aqueous extracts of charred wood, or the charred wood itself.

References

Further reading
Dale, Nancy; Flowering Plants of the Santa Monica Mountains, Capra Press, 1986
Baskin, Carol C.; Baskin, Jerry M. 2002. Propagation protocol for production of container Phacelia cicutaria Greene plants

External links

Jepson Manual Treatment — Phacelia cicutaria
Calflora database: Phacelia cicutaria
 Phacelia cicutaria — U.C. Photo gallery

cicutaria
Flora of California
Flora of Baja California
Flora of Nevada
Flora of the California desert regions
Flora of the Sierra Nevada (United States)
Natural history of the California chaparral and woodlands
Natural history of the California Coast Ranges
Natural history of the Channel Islands of California
Natural history of the Colorado Desert
Natural history of the Mojave Desert
Natural history of the Peninsular Ranges
Natural history of the Santa Monica Mountains
Natural history of the Transverse Ranges
Flora without expected TNC conservation status